The Israel women's national football team represents Israel in international  association football. It is fielded by Israel Football Association, the governing body of football in Israel, and competes as a member of the Union of European Football Associations, having previously been a part of the Asian Football Confederation. This is a list of Israel women's international footballers who have played for the national team in an "A" international match.

The first official international football match took place on 2 November 1997 against Romania.

Karin Sendel is Israel's most capped player with 68 appearances for the national team.

Players
Caps and goals are current as of 6 September 2022 after the match against Serbia. Players in bold have been called up to the squad in the last 12 months.

References

 
Israel
Association football player non-biographical articles
Lists of Israel international footballers